Carondelet can refer to:

People
 Francisco Luis Héctor de Carondelet (1748–1807), governor in the Spanish Empire 
 Ferry Carondelet (1473–1528), Habsburg diplomat and abbot
 Jan I Carondelet (1428–1502),  Burgundian jurist and politician
 Jean Carondelet (1469–1544), archbishop of Palermo

Places
 Carondelet, St. Louis, Missouri
 Carondelet Park in St. Louis
 Carondelet Canal and Carondelet Street in New Orleans, Louisiana
 Carondelet Reef in the Phoenix Islands in the Pacific Ocean
 Carondelet High School, an all-girls Catholic school in Concord, California
 Palacio de Carondelet (the presidential palace) in the main square (Plaza de la Independencia) in  Quito, Ecuador

Ships
 Two ships of the United States Navy have borne the name USS Carondelet:
 USS Carondelet, a gunboat on the Mississippi River during the U.S. Civil War
 USS Carondelet (IX-136), a tanker in the Pacific Ocean during World War II
 SS Carondelet, a ship active in transporting immigrants between Havana and New York City during 1877 and 1878
 CSS Carondelet, a gunboat on Lake Pontchartrain during the American Civil War